Fedor Leonidovich Kanareykin (May 29, 1955, USSR) is a Soviet ice hockey player, Russian hockey coach.  Honored coach of Russia.

In 1973 in the Junior team of the USSR won the gold medal in the European championship in 1974, repeated success in the youth team at the world championship. However, in the adult national team of the USSR never got there.

In 1976 it became the champion of the USSR in the HC Spartak Moscow.

Coaching Kanareykin started in the 90s.

September 25, 2006 Kanareykin succeeded as head coach of Metallurg Magnitogorsk the Canadian coach Dave King, who Fedor before that worked as an assistant.

Also coached hockey clubs Atlant Moscow Oblast,  Spartak Moscow, Avangard Omsk.

References

External links
 

1955 births
HC Spartak Moscow players
Honoured Coaches of Russia
Jokerit players
Krylya Sovetov Moscow players
Living people
Russian ice hockey coaches
Russian ice hockey defencemen
Soviet ice hockey defencemen
VEU Feldkirch players